Wilma Marggraff was an American politician. She was a member of the New Jersey General Assembly from 1948 to 1954. She was the first woman to serve as director of the Bergen County, New Jersey Board of Chosen Freeholders. Marggraff died on February 21, 1989, at the age of 88.

References

Year of birth missing
1989 deaths
Members of the New Jersey General Assembly
County commissioners in New Jersey
Politicians from Bergen County, New Jersey
Women state legislators in New Jersey
20th-century American politicians
20th-century American women politicians